The North Wangaratta Football / Netball Club is an Australian rules football club located 6 km north of Wangaratta in north east Victoria, Australia. The club currently competes in the Ovens & King Football League, which has two levels of football Reserves and Seniors.  The League also caters for Netball which currently has five grades – 15 & Under, C Grade (U/17's), B Reserve, B Grade, and A Grade.

The football club is currently known for its above par irrigation system, which has been implemented within the last few years along with their 2 new netball courts, which means their facilities are among the best in the league.

Football Competition History
1914 & 1915: Ovens & King Football League
1916 to 1918: Club in recess. World War I
1919 & 1920: Ovens & King Football League
1921: Club in recess
1922 to 1924: Wangaratta District Football Association
1925 to 1928: Club in recess
1929 to 1933: Ovens & King Football League
1934 to 1950: Club in recess
1951 & 1952: Benalla Tungamah Football League
1953 to 1960: Benalla & District Football League
1961 to present day: Ovens & King Football League

Football Premierships
Seniors
Benalla & District Football League
1958 – North Wangaratta: 18.14 – 122 defeated Goorambat: 9.10 – 64
Ovens & King Football League
1973 – North Wangaratta: 16.17 – 113 defeated Chiltern: 13.8 – 86
1976 – North Wangaratta: 22.16 – 148 defeated Beechworth: 7.11 – 53
1997 – North Wangaratta: 22.14 – 146 defeated Greta: 8.14 – 62
2012 – North Wangaratta: 20.10 – 130 defeated Whorouly: 12.11 – 83

Reserves
Ovens & King Football League
1962, 1996, 1997, 2003, 2012

Thirds
Ovens & King Football League
2010

Netball Premierships
Ovens & King Football League
A. Grade
1979, 1980, 1981, 1982

C. Grade
2008

15 & Under
2019

References

External links

Australian rules football clubs in Victoria (Australia)
1914 establishments in Australia
Australian rules football clubs established in 1914